Mark Rankin Herring (born September 25, 1961) is an American lawyer and politician who served as the 47th Attorney General of Virginia from 2014 to 2022. A Democrat, he previously served in the Senate of Virginia since a 2006 special election, representing the 33rd district, made up of parts of Fairfax and Loudoun counties. In 2021, Herring lost re-election for a third term to Republican challenger Jason Miyares.

Early life and education
Herring was born in Johnson City, Tennessee, and moved to Leesburg, Virginia at the age of 12. Raised by Jane Rankin Herring, a single mother, he graduated from Loudoun Valley High School in 1979 and worked in construction and many other jobs to pay for college. He eventually obtained a Bachelor of Arts, majoring in foreign affairs and economics at the University of Virginia. He also obtained a Master of Arts in foreign affairs from UVA. He later obtained a J.D. from the University of Richmond School of Law.

Early career
He served in elected office on the Loudoun County Board of Supervisors from 2000 to 2003, and was the town attorney for Lovettsville, Virginia, from 1992 to 1999.

Herring was elected to the Senate of Virginia in a special election triggered by Republican Bill Mims' appointment as chief deputy attorney general of Virginia. He was re-elected to a full term in the 2007 election, and re-elected again in 2011.

He is the principal with The Herring Law Firm, P.C., in Leesburg, Virginia.

Attorney General of Virginia

Elections

2013

On July 24, 2012, he announced that he would run for the office of Attorney General of Virginia, in the 2013 elections. On April 2, 2013, The Democratic Party of Virginia certified that Herring's name would appear on the June primary ballot. Herring defeated Justin Fairfax in the Democratic primary in June 11, 2013, winning narrowly by a margin of 52% to 48%.

He faced Republican Mark Obenshain in the general election. On the night of the election, Obenshain held a 1,200-vote lead over Herring. Vote totals fluctuated as ballots were canvassed in the following days, and the race remained too close to call. On November 12, 2013, with all ballots counted, Herring held a 165-vote lead, or less than 0.01%, and Obenshain requested a recount. Herring's total increased during the recount, so Obenshain conceded the election on December 18, 2013, and later that day, the recount ended with Herring winning by 907 votes, or 0.04%. Herring was sworn into office on January 11, 2014.

2017

Herring faced no opposition in the Democratic primary and won his party's endorsement for re-election. He defeated Republican opponent John Donley Adams and won re-election by 53% to 47%.

2021

On September 2, 2020, Herring announced that he would be seeking re-election as attorney general instead of running for governor. On November 2, 2021, Herring lost his reelection bid to Republican challenger Jason Miyares, a Virginia House delegate. He slightly outperformed the other candidates Terry McAuliffe and Hala Ayala, who were all on the Democratic ticket.

Tenure

Virginia Marriage Amendment 
On January 23, 2014, Herring announced that he would not defend the Virginia Marriage Amendment in federal court, and filed a brief in a federal lawsuit being brought against the law asking for it to be struck down. Herring said in a press conference announcing the move, "I believe the freedom to marry is a fundamental right and I intend to ensure that Virginia is on the right side of history and the right side of the law."

Reaction to the announcement was mainly along party lines, with Democrats mostly praising the move and Republicans mostly criticizing it as violating his oath of office. The National Organization for Marriage has called for Herring's impeachment, claiming that the Virginia attorney general is obligated to defend all state laws against challenges. In the press conference, Herring said, "There are those who will say that the attorney general is required to defend every challenge to a state law, even a law that is unconstitutional. They could not be more wrong."

The U.S. District Court in Norfolk ruled the amendment unconstitutional in the case Bostic v. Schaefer on February 13, 2014. On July 28, 2014, the Fourth Circuit Court of Appeals issued a 2–1 opinion upholding the lower court's decision. This was appealed to the Supreme Court of the United States, which denied a writ of certiorari, letting the Fourth Circuit Court's decision stand and legalizing same-sex marriage in Virginia.

Gerrymandering case 
In 2019, Mark Herring and the Democratic Party won their case against gerrymandering in Virginia elections when the U.S. Supreme Court dismissed the Virginia House GOP's appeal.

Blackface controversy

A few days after the controversy began over a blackface picture appearing on Ralph Northam's page in a 1984 medical school yearbook in the context of the 2019 Virginia political crisis, Herring admitted to an incident in which he also wore blackface: Herring had previously called on Northam to resign after the discovery of Northam's yearbook page, saying, "It is no longer possible for Governor Northam to lead our Commonwealth, and it is time for him to step down." He later clarified that the discovery of the yearbook page was not the reason he called for Northam's resignation; he did so because Northam had initially admitted to appearing in the photo, but the following day, "came out with a different and contradictory account, and that was when there was an erosion of trust."

Healthcare case
As attorney general of the Commonwealth of Virginia, Mark Herring took the case for Obamacare to the United States Supreme Court.

Advanced Towing case
On June 25, 2020, Herring filed a lawsuit against Advanced Towing Company, LLC, a towing and recovery operator based in Arlington, Virginia. The Complaint alleges that Advanced Towing has violated Virginia and Arlington County towing code provisions, resulting in towing conduct that is “frequently predatory, aggressive, overreaching and illegal.”  Virginia State Senator Chap Peterson represented Advanced Towing in the case.

Personal life
Herring and his wife Laura live in Leesburg, Virginia. They have two adult children, daughter Peyton and son Tim. His step-father was former state Senator Charlie Waddell.

Electoral history

Board of Supervisors
1999

State Senate 
2003

2006

2007

2011

Attorney General 
2013

2017
Herring ran unopposed in the 2017 Democratic primary.

2021

References

External links

 Government website
 Campaign website
 Senator Mark Herring at the Senate of Virginia (archived)
 
 Senator Mark Herring (D-Leesburg) at Richmond Sunlight
 

|-

1961 births
21st-century American politicians
American Presbyterians
County supervisors in Virginia
Living people
People from Johnson City, Tennessee
People from Leesburg, Virginia
People from Lovettsville, Virginia
University of Richmond School of Law alumni
University of Virginia alumni
Virginia Attorneys General
Virginia lawyers
Democratic Party Virginia state senators